In the United States, a placer claim grants to the discoverer of valuable minerals contained in loose material such as sand or gravel the right to mine on public land.  Other countries such as Canada, Mexico, and Australia grant similar rights.  In the United States, the valuable mineral in a placer claim is almost always gold, although other nations mine placer deposits of platinum, tin, and diamonds.  Another type of mining claim is a lode claim.

A mining claim allows some security of tenure for the owner, providing an incentive to invest time and money developing the deposit.  Mining claim laws vary from state to state, but claims staked over federal minerals follow federal mining law.  Federal minerals are managed by the U.S. Bureau of Land Management (BLM).

Mining claims staked under either State or federal laws (state claims may only be staked on state-owned and managed lands; federal claims may only be staked on minerals owned by the federal government) are limited to lands available for claim staking at the time the claims are staked. Thus, if the land is not available for mineral entry (example: withdrawn due to its status as a park or refuge), then the claim is said to be invalid ab initio. An additional requirement is "Discovery", which follows the "Prudent Man Rule." This means that a sufficient indication of valuable mineral(s) would encourage a "Prudent Man" to further invest time and money developing the deposit towards the goal of mining it.

The holder of a mining claim does not own the surface, the water, or even the rocks and gravel. A mining claim grants the holder with the preferential right to extract the valuable minerals within the claim, and for uses incident to that goal, such as prospecting, exploration and development. Gold mining is one of the most common uses for the staking of mining claims.

The boundaries of the claim must follow the 4 cardinal directions, with an exception being adjustments for existing valid claims. "Claim jumping", which happens to this day, is a case where one person overstakes the claims of another. This results in civil action, and sometimes violence.

Claims staked on Federal-managed lands fall under Federal rules. The claim must be either placer or lode, and the discovery point must be clearly marked.

The claim staking procedure includes setting a monument (a post of at least 3" in diameter and at least 3' visible above the ground, or a rock monument at least 3' in height) at the NE corner of the claim. This is known as the Number 1 corner, and it is here that the claimant places the location notice. Three additional monuments, one at each corner of the mining claim, must be set, numbered in a clockwise direction.

Copies of the claim documents must be filed in the local offices of the land managers, and filing fees paid. This must be completed within 45 days of the staking. In addition, fees for annual rental, filing, and work (or payments in lieu of labor) to fulfill requirements of "annual labor" must be completed by the deadlines set by the regulations in order to hold the claim. Failure to meet any of these requirements will result in a declaration of abandonment, and the claim cannot be restaked by the original locator or a successor in interest for one year from the date of abandonment. During this time, the claim may be relocated by others.

See also
 General Mining Act of 1872

References
Alaska Department of Natural Resources
How To Stake a Mining Claim
How to Find Gold
Mining Claim Definition

Mineral exploration
Surface mining